Teutopolis is a village in Effingham County, Illinois, United States. As of the 2020 census it had a population of 1,618.

Geography
Teutopolis is located in northeastern Effingham County at  (39.132125, -88.478435). U.S. Route 40 (National Road) passes through the center of the village, leading west  into Effingham, the county seat, and east  to Montrose.

History 

Teutopolis, "City of the Teutons", or Germans, was established in 1839 along the National Road, now U.S. Route 40. It is the only town in the United States with this name.

Teutopolis did not evolve as the accidental by-product of a trading post, church, inn, stage coach relay station, or junction of roadways or railroads, but was the result of much thought and controversy, hard-headed economy, investigation, planning and a vast amount of patience. Clemens Uptmor from the Duchy of Oldenburg, and Kingdom of Hanover, Germany, came to the United States in 1834 along with his brother Herman H. Uptmor and a few neighbors. They settled first in Cincinnati, then the gateway to the west for German Catholics. In 1837 they formed a land company for the purchase of government land under the name of "Deutsche Land-Compagnie oder Ansiedlungsgesellschaft". John F. Waschefort, Clemens Uptmor and Gerard H. Bergfeld were named to find a location for settlement and then give their recommendations to the land company. The committee opposed settling in Missouri because of slavery and were discouraged from settling in the north central area of Illinois because of the swamps and the black soil. The northeast part of Effingham County was recommended because of the woodlands, well-drained uplands and plentiful game.

Gerhardt Meyer and Heinrich Roennebaum accompanied the original trio back to Illinois to inspect the proposed site. The location was approved, and in July 1839 in Vandalia the land was claimed for homestead purposes in the name of John F. Waschefort.  were purchased at $1.25 per acre, with an additional  being purchased for $5.00 an acre. The town site was surveyed and platted by William J. Hankins. The plan of the town was very similar to the plat of the original town of Cincinnati.

Back in Cincinnati the land was allotted at a drawing held in a fire engine house.

Demographics

As of the census of 2000, there were 1,559 people, 537 households, and 397 families residing in the village. The racial makeup of the village was 99.81% White, 0.13% Asian, and 0.06% from two or more races. Hispanic or Latino of any race were 0.06% of the population.

There were 537 households, out of which 41.3% had children under the age of 18 living with them, 63.7% of the residents are married living together, 7.8% had a female householder with no husband present, and 25.9% were non-families. 22.9% of all households were made up of individuals, and 11.2% had someone living alone who was 65 years of age or older.  The average household size was 2.89 and the average family size was 3.48.

In the village, the population was spread out, with 33.2% under the age of 18, 7.3% from 18 to 24, 28.0% from 25 to 44, 18.6% from 45 to 64, and 12.9% who were 65 years of age or older.  The median age was 33 years. For every 100 females there were 99.6 males.  For every 100 females age 18 and over, there were 97.9 males.

The median income for a household in the village was $47,450, and the median income for a family was $55,461. Males had a median income of $33,661 versus $21,087 for females. The per capita income for the village was $21,280.  About 2.5% of families and 4.8% of the population were below the poverty line, including 4.5% of those under age 18 and 5.7% of those age 65 or over.

References

External links
 Village website

Villages in Effingham County, Illinois
Populated places established in 1839
German-American history